The Battle of Brest was fought on 19 July 1592 between the Ottoman forces of Hasan Pasha Predojević, Beglerbeg of Bosnia, and the Germanic and Croatian forces led by Tamás Erdődy, Ban of Croatia. The battle was a part of the Croatian–Ottoman wars and Ottoman–Habsburg wars between the Ottoman Empire and the Habsburg monarchy.

The Ottoman forces were about 7,000-8,000 men, and Erdödy's army consisted of 1,600 infantry and 400 cavalry from Styria,  500 men arrived under Erdödy's command, and an unknown number (several hundred) of peasants from Croatia. In total, the forces gathered at Erdödy's camp were about 3,000 men. Predojević arrived near Brest with the bulk of his army on 18/19 July at night, and on 19 July he separated his forces in order to attack. Croatian forces were crushed and  fled away from the battlefield. The Ottomans then attacked the Styrian forces and defeated them as well.

Following these successes, the Ottomans began to besiege the Sisak fortress.

Bibliography
Vojna enciklopedija (1970–76), 10 volumes, Vojno izdavački zavod Beograd, book 2, p. 8, article Brest

References

Battles involving Habsburg Croatia
Battles involving the Ottoman Empire
1592 in military history
Brest
History of Banovina
1592 in Croatia